Sakharny Zavod is a rural locality (a settlement) in Bichursky District, Republic of Buryatia, Russia. The population was 854 as of 2010. There are 8 streets.

Geography 
Sakharny Zavod is located 8 km northwest of Bichura (the district's administrative centre) by road. Bichura is the nearest rural locality.

References 

Rural localities in Bichursky District